Theclopsis is a genus of butterflies in the family Lycaenidae. The species of this genus are found in the Neotropical realm.

Species
Theclopsis demea (Hewitson, 1874) Nicaragua, Panama
Theclopsis lydus (Hübner, [1819]) Surinam, French Guiana, Venezuela, Ecuador, Peru, Bolivia, Brazil
Theclopsis murex (Druce, 1907) Brazil(Rio Grande do Sul, Rio de Janeiro)
Theclopsis leos (Schaus, 1913) Costa Rica
Theclopsis epidius (Godman & Salvin, [1887]) Panama, Colombia
Theclopsis gargara (Hewitson, 1868) Brazil (Pará), Colombia, Panama.
Theclopsis mycon (Godman & Salvin, [1887]) Mexico, Guatemala, Panama, Colombia, Amazonas
Theclopsis aurina Robbins, 2002 Colombia

External links
"Theclopsis Godman & Salvin, [1887]" at Markku Savela's Lepidoptera and Some Other Life Forms

Eumaeini
Lycaenidae of South America
Lycaenidae genera
Taxa named by Frederick DuCane Godman
Taxa named by Osbert Salvin